Lorraine Pearson (born Lorraine Samantha Jean Pearson; 10 August 1967 in Wembley, London, England) is a British singer and was a member of the pop group, Five Star.

She is the sister of Denise, Doris, Delroy and Stedman Pearson, and the daughter of Buster Pearson. She performs in the genres of pop music and contemporary R & B and has written a romance novel Her, Me and Reality and has just published a new children's story book entitled "Be Careful What You Wish For" available on preorder now at https://austinmacauley.ae/books/be-careful-what-you-wish-for/ release date June 30th 2022 at all good book stores.

References

1967 births
Living people
20th-century Black British women singers
British contemporary R&B singers
Five Star members
English people of Jamaican descent